The FSHV Cup is a competition featuring professional volleyball clubs from Albania and it is contested between the 4 clubs that finished highest in the previous Albanian Volleyball League.

Title holders
 2011 ?
 2012 Teuta
 2013 ?
 2014 Tirana
 2015 Studenti
 2016 Farka Volley

References

External links 
FSHV Official Website

See also
 Albanian Volleyball Federation
 Albanian Volleyball League
 Albanian Volleyball Cup

Volleyball in Albania